Fluviopupa is a genus of very small freshwater snails that have an operculum, aquatic gastropod mollusks in the family Tateidae.

Species
Species within the genus Flaviopupa include:
 Fluviopupa adkinsi Zielske & Haase, 2014
 Fluviopupa bakeri Zielske & Haase, 2014
 Fluviopupa brevior (Ancey, 1905)
 Fluviopupa daunivucu Haase, Ponder & Bouchet, 2006
 Fluviopupa derua Haase, Ponder & Bouchet, 2006
 Fluviopupa erromangoana Zielske & Haase, 2014
 Fluviopupa espiritusantoana Haase, Fontaine & Gargominy, 2010
 Fluviopupa freswota Zielske & Haase, 2014
 Fluviopupa gracilis (Iredale, 1944)
 Fluviopupa herminae Zielske & Haase, 2014
 Fluviopupa irinimeke Haase, Ponder & Bouchet, 2006
 Fluviopupa kessneri Ponder & Shea, 2014
 Fluviopupa lali Haase, Ponder & Bouchet, 2006
 Fluviopupa lalinimeke Haase, Ponder & Bouchet, 2006
 Fluviopupa malekulana Zielske & Haase, 2014
 Fluviopupa mekeniyaqona Haase, Ponder & Bouchet, 2006
 Fluviopupa mekewesi Haase, Ponder & Bouchet, 2006
 Fluviopupa melissae Haase, Fontaine & Gargominy, 2010
 Fluviopupa narii Haase, Fontaine & Gargominy, 2010
 Fluviopupa pascali Haase, Fontaine & Gargominy, 2010
 Fluviopupa pentecostata Zielske & Haase, 2014
 Fluviopupa pikinini Zielske & Haase, 2014
 Fluviopupa priei Haase, Fontaine & Gargominy, 2010
 Fluviopupa pupoidea Pilsbry, 1911
 Fluviopupa ramsayi (Brazier, 1889)
 Fluviopupa riva Zielske & Haase, 2014
 Fluviopupa seasea Haase, Ponder & Bouchet, 2006
 Fluviopupa smolwan Haase, Fontaine & Gargominy, 2010
 Fluviopupa snel Haase, Fontaine & Gargominy, 2010
 Fluviopupa tangbunia Zielske & Haase, 2014
 Fluviopupa titusi Haase, Fontaine & Gargominy, 2010
 Fluviopupa torresiana Haase, Fontaine & Gargominy, 2010
 Fluviopupa vakamalolo Haase, Ponder & Bouchet, 2006
 Fluviopupa walterlinii Haase, Fontaine & Gargominy, 2010

References

External links 

 Australian Biological Resources Study info
 Pilsbry H.A. (1911) Non-marine Mollusca of Patagonia. Report of the Princeton University expeditions to Patagonia, 1896-1899 3(5): 513-633, pis 38-47 + 5

 
Tateidae
Taxonomy articles created by Polbot
Gastropod genera